

Days of the month

30 September 2012 (Sunday)

Auto racing
Sprint Cup Series – Chase for the Sprint Cup:
AAA 400 in Dover, Delaware: (1)  Brad Keselowski (Dodge; Penske Racing) (2)  Jeff Gordon (Chevrolet; Hendrick Motorsports) (3)  Mark Martin (Toyota; Michael Waltrip Racing)
Drivers' championship standings (after 29 of 36 races): (1) Keselowski 2142 points (2)  Jimmie Johnson (Chevrolet; Hendrick Motorsports) 2137 (3)  Denny Hamlin (Toyota; Joe Gibbs Racing) 2126

Baseball
Major League Baseball: 
In Arlington, Texas: Los Angeles Angels of Anaheim 5, Texas Rangers 4.
Angels outfielder Mike Trout becomes the youngest player in MLB history to collect 30 home runs and 30 stolen bases in a single season at the age of 21 years, 54 days.
In Pittsburgh, Pennsylvania: Cincinnati Reds 4, Pittsburgh Pirates 3.
Pirates extend their MLB record for most consecutive losing season to 20 as they rack up their 82nd loss of the season.

Basketball
WNBA playoffs:
Conference Semifinals:
Eastern Conference Game 2 in Atlanta, Georgia: Indiana Fever 103, Atlanta Dream 88. Series tied 1–1.
Western Conference Game 2 in Seattle, Washington: Seattle Storm 86, Minnesota Lynx 79. Series tied 1–1.

Rugby league
NRL Grand Final in Sydney: Canterbury-Bankstown Bulldogs 4–11 Melbourne Storm
Storm win the title for the first time since 1999 and second time overall. Storm halfback Cooper Cronk is awarded Clive Churchill Medal as Man of the Match.

29 September 2012 (Saturday)

Australian rules football
AFL Grand Final in Melbourne: Hawthorn 11.15 (81) – 14.7 (91) Sydney
Sydney win the title for the first time since 2005 and fifth time overall.

Basketball
WNBA playoffs:
Conference Semifinals:
Eastern Conference Game 2 in Newark, New Jersey: Connecticut Sun 75, New York Liberty 62. Sun win series 2–0.
Western Conference Game 2 in San Antonio, Texas: Los Angeles Sparks 101, San Antonio Silver Stars 94. Sparks win series 2–0.

Mixed martial arts
UFC on Fuel TV: Struve vs. Miocic in Nottingham, England (ENG unless stated):
Welterweight bout: Che Mills def. Duane Ludwig  via TKO (knee injury)
Welterweight bout: John Hathaway def. John Maguire via unanimous decision (30–27, 30–27, 30–27)
Lightweight bout: Matt Wiman  def. Paul Sass via submission (armbar)
Bantamweight bout: Brad Pickett def. Yves Jabouin  via KO (punches)
Welterweight bout: Dan Hardy def. Amir Sadollah  via unanimous decision (29–28, 29–28, 30–27)
Heavyweight bout: Stefan Struve  def. Stipe Miocic  via TKO (punches)

Rugby union
The Rugby Championship, Round 5:
In Pretoria, South Africa:  31–8 
In La Plata, Argentina:  15–54 
Standings: New Zealand 21 points, South Africa 12, Australia 8, Argentina 3.
New Zealand win the inaugural Rugby Championship title.

28 September 2012 (Friday)

Baseball
Major League Baseball: 
In Pittsburgh, Pennsylvania: Cincinnati Reds 1, Pittsburgh Pirates 0.
Reds pitcher Homer Bailey throws the 15th no–hitter in franchise history; the first since Tom Browning pitched a perfect game on September 16, 1988.

Basketball
WNBA playoffs:
Conference Semifinals:
Eastern Conference Game 1 in Indianapolis, Indiana: Atlanta Dream 75, Indiana Fever 66. Dream lead series 1–0.
Western Conference Game 1 in Minneapolis, Minnesota: Minnesota Lynx 78, Seattle Storm 70. Lynx lead series 1–0.

27 September 2012 (Thursday)

Basketball
WNBA playoffs:
Conference Semifinals:
Eastern Conference Game 1 in Uncasville, Connecticut: Connecticut Sun 65, New York Liberty 60. Sun lead series 1–0.
Western Conference Game 1 in Los Angeles, California: Los Angeles Sparks 93, San Antonio Silver Stars 86. Sparks lead series 1–0.

Football (soccer)
UEFA Women's Champions League Round of 32, first leg:
Unia Racibórz  –  Wolfsburg
SFK 2000  –  Sparta Praha
MTK  –  LdB Malmö
ADO Den Haag  –  Rossiyanka
Copa Sudamericana Round of 16, first leg: Colón  –  Cerro Porteño

26 September 2012 (Wednesday)

Football (soccer)
FIFA U-17 Women's World Cup Group Stage, matchday 2:
Group C:
 0–3 
 0–3 
Group D:
 0–5 
 1–1 
UEFA Women's Champions League Round of 32, first leg:
BIIK Kazygurt  0–4  Røa
Birmingham City  2–0  Bardolino Verona
Spartak Subotica  0–1  Göteborg
Apollon Limassol  2–3  Torres
PK-35 Vantaa  0–7  Lyon
Olimpia Cluj  1–1  Neulengbach
Barcelona  0–3  Arsenal
Stabæk  2–0  Brøndby
Standard Liège  1–3  Turbine Potsdam
Glasgow City  1–2  Fortuna Hjørring
Stjarnan  0–0  Zorky Krasnogorsk
Copa Sudamericana Round of 16, first leg:
LDU Loja  1–1  São Paulo
Barcelona  0–1  Grêmio

25 September 2012 (Tuesday)

Football (soccer)
FIFA U-17 Women's World Cup Group Stage, matchday 2:
Group A:
 0–1 
 0–11 
Group B:
 1–1 
 6–0 
UEFA Women's Champions League Round of 32, first leg: Zürich  1–1  Juvisy
Copa Sudamericana Round of 16, first leg:
Independiente  2–1  Liverpool
Deportivo Quito  2–0  Tigre

24 September 2012 (Monday)

Baseball
World Baseball Classic Qualifier 2 Final in Regensburg, Germany:  11,  1 (F/8). Canada qualifies for the main tournament in March 2013.

23 September 2012 (Sunday)

Auto racing
Formula One: 
Singapore Grand Prix in Marina Bay, Singapore: (1) Sebastian Vettel  (Red Bull-Renault) (2) Jenson Button  (McLaren-Mercedes) (3) Fernando Alonso  (Ferrari)
Drivers' championship standings (after 14 of 20 races): (1) Alonso 194 points (2) Vettel 165 (3) Kimi Räikkönen  (Lotus-Renault) 149
Constructors' championship standings: (1) Red Bull-Renault 297 points (2) McLaren-Mercedes 261 (3) Ferrari 245
Sprint Cup Series – Chase for the Sprint Cup:
Sylvania 300 in Loudon, New Hampshire: (1)  Denny Hamlin (Toyota; Joe Gibbs Racing) (2)  Jimmie Johnson (Chevrolet; Hendrick Motorsports) (3)  Jeff Gordon (Chevrolet; Hendrick Motorsports)
Drivers' championship standings (after 28 of 36 races): (1) Johnson 2096 points (2)  Brad Keselowski (Dodge; Penske Racing) 2095 (3) Hamlin 2089

Baseball
World Baseball Classic qualification:
Qualifier 1 Final in Jupiter, Florida, United States:  9,  7 (F/10). Spain qualifies for the main tournament in March 2013.
Qualifier 2 in Regensburg, Germany:  16,  1 (F/7). Great Britain is eliminated.

Cycling
UCI Road World Championships:
Men's road race:  Philippe Gilbert   Edvald Boasson Hagen   Alejandro Valverde

Football (soccer)
FIFA U-17 Women's World Cup Group Stage, matchday 1:
Group C:
 1–0 
 0–5 
Group D:
 0–4 
 1–2

Gaelic football
All-Ireland Senior Championship Final in Dublin: Donegal 2–11 – 0–13 Mayo
Donegal win the title for the first time since 1992 and second time overall.

Sumo
Aki basho (September grand tournament) in Tokyo, Japan:
Harumafuji Kōhei defeats Hakuhō Shō to win his 4th makuuchi (top division) championship with second consecutive perfect 15–0 record, and guarantees himself promotion to 70th yokozuna.

22 September 2012 (Saturday)

Baseball
World Baseball Classic qualification:
Qualifier 1 in Jupiter, Florida, United States:
 5,  2 (F/11). France is eliminated.
 13,  3. South Africa is eliminated.
Qualifier 2 in Regensburg, Germany:
 12,  5. Czech Republic is eliminated.
 16,  7.
Major League Baseball:
In Cincinnati, Ohio: Cincinnati Reds 6, Los Angeles Dodgers 0.
The Reds clinch the National League Central title for the first time since 2010 and third time overall, and advance to the Division Series.
In San Francisco, California: San Francisco Giants 8, San Diego Padres 4.
The Giants clinch the National League West title for the first time since 2010 and eighth time overall, and advance to the Division Series.

Cycling
UCI Road World Championships:
Women's road race:  Marianne Vos   Rachel Neylan   Elisa Longo Borghini

Football (soccer)
FIFA U-17 Women's World Cup Group Stage, matchday 1:
Group A:
 1–1 
 0–4 
Group B:
 11–0 
 0–0

Mixed martial arts
UFC 152 in Toronto, Ontario, Canada (USA unless stated):
Catchweight (146.2 lb) bout: Cub Swanson def. Charles Oliveira  via KO (punch)
Light Heavyweight bout: Matt Hamill def. Roger Hollett  via unanimous decision (29–28, 30–27, 30–27)
Middleweight bout: Michael Bisping  def. Brian Stann via unanimous decision (29–28, 29–28, 29–28)
Inaugural Flyweight Championship bout: Demetrious Johnson def. Joseph Benavidez via split decision (48–47, 47–48, 49–46)
Light Heavyweight Championship bout: Jon Jones (c) def. Vitor Belfort  via submission (keylock)

21 September 2012 (Friday)

Baseball
World Baseball Classic qualification:
Qualifier 1 in Jupiter, Florida, United States:
 4,  2.
 vs.  — game suspended with the score tied at 2–2 after 9 innings due to rain; will be resumed on 22 September.
Qualifier 2 in Regensburg, Germany:  16,  1 (F/6).
Nippon Professional Baseball: 
In Bunkyo, Tokyo: Yomiuri Giants 6, Tokyo Yakult Swallows 4.
The Giants win their first Central League title since 2009, and earn a one-win and home field advantage for Climax Series Final Stage.

20 September 2012 (Wednesday)

Baseball
World Baseball Classic qualification:
Qualifier 1 in Jupiter, Florida, United States:  8,  0.
Qualifier 2 in Regensburg, Germany:  11,  1 (F/7).

Football (soccer)
CONCACAF Champions League Group Stage, matchday 4:
Group 3: Houston Dynamo  4–0  FAS
Group 7: Municipal  2–1  Chorrillo
Copa Sudamericana Second Stage, second leg (first leg scores in parentheses):
Liverpool  1–0 (1–1)  Envigado. Liverpool won on points 4–1
UEFA Europa League group stage, matchday 1:
Group A:
Young Boys  3–5  Liverpool
Udinese  1–1  Anzhi Makhachkala
Group B:
Hapoel Tel Aviv  0–3  Atlético Madrid
Viktoria Plzeň  3–1  Académica
Group C:
AEL Limassol  0–0  Borussia Mönchengladbach
Fenerbahçe  2–2  Marseille
Group D:
Marítimo  0–0  Newcastle United
Bordeaux  4–0  Club Brugge
Group E:
Stuttgart  2–2  Steaua București
Copenhagen  2–1  Molde
Group F:
Dnipro Dnipropetrovsk  2–0  PSV Eindhoven
Napoli  4–0  AIK
Group G:
Genk  3–0  Videoton
Sporting CP  0–0  Basel
Group H:
Internazionale  2–2  Rubin Kazan
Partizan  0–0  Neftchi Baku
Group I:
Lyon  2–1  Sparta Prague
Athletic Bilbao  1–1  Ironi Kiryat Shmona
Group J:
Maribor  3–0  Panathinaikos
Tottenham Hotspur  0–0  Lazio
Group K:
Rapid Wien  1–2  Rosenborg
Bayer Leverkusen  0–0  Metalist Kharkiv
Group L:
Levante  1–0  Helsingborg
Twente  2–2  Hannover 96

19 September 2012 (Wednesday)

Baseball
World Baseball Classic Qualifier 1 in Jupiter, Florida, United States:  7,  3.

Cycling
UCI Road World Championships:
Men's time trial:  Tony Martin  58' 38.76"  Taylor Phinney  + 5.37"  Vasil Kiryienka  + 1' 44.99"

Football (soccer)
AFC Champions League Quarter-finals, first leg:
Adelaide United  2–2  Bunyodkor
Ulsan Hyundai  1–0  Al-Hilal
Sepahan  0–0  Al-Ahli
 Al-Ittihad  4–2  Guangzhou Evergrande
CONCACAF Champions League Group Stage, matchday 4:
Group 1: Águila  0–4  Santos Laguna
Group 4: Marathón  2–3  Seattle Sounders FC
Group 5: Puerto Rico Islanders  0–0  Los Angeles Galaxy
Copa Sudamericana Second Stage, second leg (first leg scores in parentheses):
Millonarios  1–1 (4–2)  Guaraní. Millonarios won on points 4–1
Cerro Porteño  4–0 (2–2)  Mineros de Guayana. Cerro Porteño won on points 4–1.
Barcelona  4–3 (0–0)  Cobreloa. Barcelona won on points 4–1
UEFA Champions League group stage, matchday 1:
Group E:
Shakhtar Donetsk  2–0  Nordsjælland
Chelsea  2–2  Juventus
Group F:
Lille  1–3  BATE Borisov
Bayern Munich  2–1  Valencia
Group G:
Barcelona  3–2  Spartak Moscow
Celtic  0–0  Benfica
Group H:
Manchester United  1–0  Galatasaray
Braga  0–2  CFR Cluj
UEFA Women's Euro 2013 qualifying, final matchday (teams in bold qualify for the Euro 2013, teams in italics advance to the playoff round):
Group 1:
 0–0 
 1–0 
 1–1 
Final standings: Italy 28, Russia 22, Poland 17, Bosnia and Herzegovina 10, Greece 5, Macedonia 2
Group 2:
 1–0 
 10–0 
 0–0 
Final standings: Germany 28 points, Spain 20, Romania 16, Switzerland 15, Kazakhstan 7, Turkey 1
Group 3:
 9–0 
 0–2 
 2–1 
Final standings: Norway 24, Iceland 22, Belgium 20, Northern Ireland 11, Hungary 10, Bulgaria 0
Group 4:
 0–2 
 0–5 
Final standings: France 24, Scotland 16, Wales 10, Republic of Ireland 9, Israel 0
Group 5:
 1–0 
 0–1 
Final standings: Finland 19 points, Ukraine 16, Belarus 13, Slovakia 10, Estonia 0
Group 6:
 3–0 
 3–0 
Final standings: England 20 points,  19, Serbia 13, Slovenia 4, Croatia 1
Group 7:
 0–2 
 2–0 
Final standings: Denmark 21 points,  19, Czech Republic 13, Portugal 6, Armenia 0

18 September 2012 (Tuesday)

Cycling
UCI Road World Championships:
Women's time trial:  Judith Arndt   Evelyn Stevens   Linda Villumsen

Football (soccer)
CONCACAF Champions League Group Stage, matchday 4:
Group 2: Tauro  0–1  Real Salt Lake
Group 6: Real Estelí  1–1  UANL
Group 8: Xelajú  3–2  W Connection
Copa Sudamericana Second Stage, second leg (first leg scores in parentheses):
Emelec  0–0 (1–0)  Olimpia. Emelec won on points 4–1
Deportes Tolima  3–1 (0–2)  Universidad Católica. Tied on points 3–3, Universidad Católica won on away goals
Aurora  1–3 (1–2)  Deportivo Quito. Deportivo Quito won on points 6–0
Nacional  1–2 (1–0)  LDU Loja. Tied on points 3–3, LDU Loja won on away goals
UEFA Champions League group stage, matchday 1:
Group A:
Dinamo Zagreb  0–2  Porto
Paris Saint-Germain  4–1  Dynamo Kyiv
Group B:
Montpellier  1–2  Arsenal
Olympiacos  1–2  Schalke 04
Group C:
Málaga  3–0  Zenit St. Petersburg
Milan  0–0  Anderlecht
Group D:
Borussia Dortmund  1–0  Ajax
Real Madrid  3–2  Manchester City

17 September 2012 (Monday)

16 September 2012 (Sunday)

Auto racing
World Rally Championship:
Wales Rally GB: (1) Jari-Matti Latvala  (Ford Fiesta RS WRC) (2) Sébastien Loeb  (Citroën DS3 WRC) (3) Petter Solberg  (Ford Fiesta RS WRC)
Driver's standings (after 10 of 13 races): (1) Loeb 219 points, (2) Mikko Hirvonen  (Citroën DS3 WRC) 158, (3) Solberg 119. 
Sprint Cup Series – Chase for the Sprint Cup:
GEICO 400 in Joliet, Illinois: (1)  Brad Keselowski (Dodge; Penske Racing) (2)  Jimmie Johnson (Chevrolet; Hendrick Motorsports) (3)  Kasey Kahne (Chevrolet; Hendrick Motorsports)
Drivers' championship standings (after 27 of 36 races): (1) Keselowski 2056 points (2) Johnson 2053 (3)  Tony Stewart (Chevrolet; Stewart-Haas Racing) 2048

Football (soccer)
CAF Champions League group stage, final matchday (teams in bold advance to semifinals):
Group B:
Berekum Chelsea  1–0  TP Mazembe
Al-Ahly  1–1  Zamalek
Final standings: Al-Ahly 11 points, TP Mazembe 10, Berekum Chelsea 9, Zamalek 2.

Tennis
Davis Cup World Group, Semifinals, day 3:
 3–1 
David Ferrer  def. John Isner  6–7(2–7), 6–3, 6–4, 6–2
 2–3 
Tomáš Berdych  def. Carlos Berlocq  6–3, 6–3, 6–4
Juan Mónaco  def. Ivo Minář  6–3, 7–6(7–2)
Davis Cup World Group Play-offs, day 3:
 3–1 
Mikhail Kukushkin  def. Denis Istomin  6–4, 6–2, 6–7(7-4), 6–2
 3–2 
Florian Mayer  def. Bernard Tomic  6–4, 6–2, 6–3
Cedrik-Marcel Stebe  def. Lleyton Hewitt  6–4, 6–1, 6–4
 2–3 
Kei Nishikori  def. Dudi Sela  6–3, 3–6, 4–6, 6–4, 7–5
Amir Weintraub  def. Go Soeda  6–3, 7–6(7–5), 4–6, 6–3
 5–0 
David Goffin  def. Markus Eriksson  6–3, 6–4
Steve Darcis  def. Andreas Vinciguerra  6–4, 6–2
 4–1 
Milos Raonic  def. Izak van der Merwe  6–2, 6–2, 6–4
Frank Dancevic  def. Nikala Scholtz  6–2, 6–2
 5–0 
Thomaz Bellucci  def. Alex Bogomolov, Jr.  7–6(7–4), 6–3
Rogério Dutra da Silva  def. Stanislav Vovk  6–2, 6–2
 4–1 
Andreas Seppi  def. Paul Capdeville  6–3, 6–1, 6–3
Simone Bolelli  def. Christian Garín  6–4, 6–3
 2–3 
Roger Federer  def. Robin Haase  6–1, 6–4, 6–4
Thiemo de Bakker  def. Marco Chiudinelli  6–2, 7–6(7–4)
WTA Tour:
Tashkent Open in Tashkent, Uzbekistan:
Final: Irina-Camelia Begu  def. Donna Vekić  6–4, 6–4
Begu wins her first WTA title.
Bell Challenge in Quebec City, Canada:
Final: Kirsten Flipkens  def. Lucie Hradecká  6–1, 7–5
Flipkens wins her first WTA title.

15 September 2012 (Saturday)

Roller hockey
European Championship in Paredes, Portugal, final matchday:
Germany  3–4  France
Switzerland  1–4  Italy
Portugal  4–5  Spain
Final standings: Spain 18 points, Portugal 15, Italy 12, France 9, Switzerland 6, Germany 3, England 0.
Spain win their 7th European title in a row and the 16th overall.

Rugby union
The Rugby Championship, Round 4:
In Dunedin, New Zealand:  21–11 
In Gold Coast, Australia:  23–19 
Standings: New Zealand 16 points, Australia 8, South Africa 7, Argentina 3.

Tennis
Davis Cup World Group, Semifinals, day 2:
 2–1 
Bob Bryan/Mike Bryan  def. Marcel Granollers/Marc López  6–3, 3–6, 7–5, 7–5
 1–2 
Tomáš Berdych/Radek Štěpánek  def. Carlos Berlocq/Eduardo Schwank  6–3, 6–4, 6–3
Davis Cup World Group Play-offs, day 2:
 2–1 
Andrey Golubev/Yuri Schukin  def. Farrukh Dustov/Denis Istomin  7–6(7-3), 6–3, 6–4
 1–2 
Chris Guccione/Lleyton Hewitt  def. Benjamin Becker/Philipp Petzschner 6–3, 6–2, 2–6, 7–6(7–4)
 1–2 
Jonathan Erlich/Andy Ram  def. Tatsuma Ito/Yūichi Sugita  5–7, 6–3, 6–3, 6–1
 3–0 
Ruben Bemelmans/Olivier Rochus  def. Andreas Vinciguerra  6–4, 4–6, 6–3, 6–2
 2–1 
Raven Klaasen/Izak van der Merwe  def. Daniel Nestor/Vasek Pospisil 6–4, 7–6(7–2), 7–6(7–5)
 3–0 
Marcelo Melo/Bruno Soares  def. Alex Bogomolov, Jr./Teymuraz Gabashvili  7–5, 6–2, 7–6(9–7)
 2–1 
Jorge Aguilar/Paul Capdeville  def. Daniele Bracciali/Andreas Seppi  6–4, 4–6, 6–4, 6–2
 1–2 
Robin Haase/Jean-Julien Rojer  def. Roger Federer/Stanislas Wawrinka  6–4, 6–2, 5–7, 6–3

14 September 2012 (Friday)

Football (soccer)
CAF Champions League group stage, final matchday (teams in bold advance to semifinals):
Group A: ASO Chlef  1–0  Espérance ST
Final standings: Espérance ST 9 points,  Sunshine Stars 6, ASO Chlef 3,  Étoile du Sahel disqualified.

Roller hockey
European Championship in Paredes, Portugal, matchday 6:
France  7–1  England
Switzerland  0–6  Spain
Portugal  9–1  Germany

Tennis
Davis Cup World Group, Semifinals, day 1:
 2–0 
David Ferrer  def. Sam Querrey  4–6, 6–2, 6–2, 6–4
Nicolás Almagro  def. John Isner  6–4, 4–6, 6–4, 3–6, 7–5
 1–1 
Juan Martín del Potro  def. Radek Štěpánek  6–4, 6–4, 6–2
Tomáš Berdych  def. Juan Mónaco  6–1, 4–6, 1–6, 6–4, 6–4
Davis Cup World Group Play-offs, day 1:
 1–1 
Denis Istomin  def. Evgeny Korolev  6–3, 4–6, 6–2, 0–6, 6–3
Mikhail Kukushkin  def. Farrukh Dustov  6–2, 6–4, 3–6, 7–6(7–5)
 1–1 
Bernard Tomic  def. Cedrik-Marcel Stebe  2–6, 6–3, 6–4, 7–6(7–4)
Florian Mayer  def. Lleyton Hewitt  7–5, 6–3, 6–2
 1–1 
Go Soeda  def. Dudi Sela  6–2, 6–4, 3–6, 6–4
Amir Weintraub  def. Tatsuma Ito  6–3, 6–2, 6–4
 2–0 
Steve Darcis  def. Michael Ryderstedt  6–3, 7–6(7–3), 6–0
David Goffin  def. Andreas Vinciguerra  6–4, 6–3, 7–5
 2–0 
Vasek Pospisil  def. Izak van der Merwe  6–3, 6–4, 6–4
Milos Raonic  def. Nikala Scholtz  7–5, 6–4, 7–5
 2–0 
Rogério Dutra da Silva  def. Igor Andreev  6–2, 6–1, retired
Thomaz Bellucci  def. Teymuraz Gabashvili  6–3, 4–6, 6–0, 7–6(7–4)
 2–0 
Andreas Seppi  def. Guillermo Hormazábal  7–5, 6–1, 6–2
Fabio Fognini  def. Paul Capdeville  2–6, 6–2, 6–7(6–8), 6–1, 6–2
 0–2 
Roger Federer  def. Thiemo de Bakker  6–3, 6–4, 6–4
Stanislas Wawrinka  def. Robin Haase  6–3, 3–6, 6–3, 7–6(7–4)

13 September 2012 (Thursday)

Roller hockey
European Championship in Paredes, Portugal, matchday 5:
Germany  0–2  Switzerland
France  4–6  Italy
England  1–23  Portugal

12 September 2012 (Wednesday)

Roller hockey
European Championship in Paredes, Portugal, matchday 4:
Switzerland  13–0  England
Spain  4–1  France
Germany  2–6  Italy

11 September 2012 (Tuesday)

Basketball
FIBA EuroBasket 2013 qualification, final matchday (teams in bold qualify for the EuroBasket 2013):
Group A:
 80–48 
 83–67 
 80–58 
Final standings: Montenegro 20 points, Israel, Serbia, Estonia 16, Iceland, Slovak Republic 11.
Group B:
 81–68 
 68–85 
Final standings: Germany 16 points, Sweden, Azerbaijan 12, Luxembourg 8.
Group C:
 78–74 
 58–63 
Final standings: Croatia 16 points,  14, Austria, Hungary 11, Cyprus 8.
Group D:
 77–85 
 97–89 
Final standings: , Georgia 14 points, Latvia 13, Netherlands 10. Romania 9.
Group E:
 84–77 
 46–82 
Final standings: , Finland 14 points, Belgium 13, Switzerland 11, Albania 8.
Group F:
 77–64 
 81–58 
Final standings:  16 points, Turkey, Czech Republic 13, Belarus 10, Portugal 8.

Football (soccer)
2014 FIFA World Cup qualification:
AFC (fourth round):
Group A:
 2–2 
 1–0 
Group B:
 1–0 
 2–1 
CONMEBOL (Round-Robin):
 1–3 
 1–1 
 0–2 
 1–1 
CONCACAF (third round), teams in bold advance to the fourth round:
Group A:
 0–1 
 1–0 
Group B:
 2–3 
 1–0 
Group C:
 2–0 
 1–0 
OFC (third round):
 6–1 
 0–4 
UEFA (first round):
Group A:
 6–1 
 1–1 
 1–1 
Group B:
 1–0 
 2–0 
Group C:
 1–2 
 2–0 
Group D:
 4–0 
 3–0 
 1–4 
Group E:
 1–0 
 2–1 
 2–0 
Group F:
 0–4 
 1–1 
 3–0 
Group G:
 4–1 
 2–0 
 2–0 
Group H:
 0–6 
 2–0 
 1–1 
Group I:
 0–1 
 3–1

Roller hockey
European Championship in Paredes, Portugal, matchday 3:
Switzerland  2–3  France
Spain  21–1  England
Portugal  3–0  Italy

10 September 2012 (Monday)

Roller hockey
European Championship in Paredes, Portugal, matchday 2:
Germany  6–1  England
Spain  2–0  Italy
Portugal  7–3  France

Tennis
Grand Slams:
US Open in New York City, United States, day 15:
Men's Singles, final: Andy Murray  [3] def. Novak Djokovic  [2] 7–6(12–10), 7–5, 2–6, 3–6, 6–2
Murray wins his first Grand Slam title and 24th overall. He becomes the first British male to win a Grand Slam singles title since Fred Perry in 1936.

9 September 2012 (Sunday)

Auto racing
Formula One:
Italian Grand Prix in Monza, Italy: (1) Lewis Hamilton  (McLaren-Mercedes) (2) Sergio Pérez  (Sauber-Ferrari) (3) Fernando Alonso  (Ferrari) 
Drivers' championship standings (after 13 of 20 races): (1) Alonso 179 points (2) Hamilton 142 (3) Kimi Räikkönen  (Lotus-Renault) 141

Cycling
Grand Tours:
Vuelta a España, Stage 21:  John Degenkolb  2h 44' 57"  Elia Viviani  s.t.  Daniele Bennati  s.t.
Final general classification (all ESP): (1) Alberto Contador  84h 59' 49" (2) Alejandro Valverde  + 1' 16" (3) Joaquim Rodríguez + 1' 37"
Contador wins his second Vuelta and his 5th Grand Tour overall.
UCI World Tour:
GP de Montréal:  Lars Petter Nordhaug  5h 28' 29"  Moreno Moser  + 2"  Alexandr Kolobnev  + 2"
UCI World Tour standings (after 26 of 28 races): (1) Bradley Wiggins  601 points (2) Joaquim Rodríguez  592 (3) Tom Boonen  410

Roller hockey
European Championship in Paredes, Portugal, matchday 1:
Spain  7–0  Germany
England  0–9  Italy
Portugal  3–1  Switzerland

Tennis
Grand Slams:
US Open in New York City, United States, day 14:
Women's Singles, final: Serena Williams  [4] def, Victoria Azarenka  [1] 6–2, 2–6, 7–5
Serena Williams wins her 4th US Open singles title and her 15th Grand Slam single title overall. 
Women's Doubles, final: Sara Errani  & Roberta Vinci  def. Andrea Hlaváčková  & Lucie Hradecká  [3] 6–4, 6–2
Errani & Vinci win their first US Open title and his second Grand Slam overall.
Men's Singles, semifinals: Novak Djokovic  [2] def. David Ferrer  [4] 2–6, 6–1, 6–4, 6–2

8 September 2012 (Saturday)

Basketball
FIBA EuroBasket 2013 qualification:
Group A:
 92–101 
 88–81 
 106–73 
Group B:
 86–91 
 120–95 
Group C:
 69–51 
 79–81 
Group D:
 70–73 
 93–58 
Group E:
 89–59 
 71–68 
Group F:
 69–79 
 83–58

Cycling
Grand Tours:
Vuelta a España, Stage 20:  Denis Menchov  4h 48' 48"  Richie Porte  + 17"  Kevin De Weert  s.t.
General classification (all ESP): (1) Alberto Contador  82h 14' 52" (2) Alejandro Valverde + 1' 16" (3) Joaquim Rodríguez  + 1' 37"

Football (soccer)
2014 FIFA World Cup qualification (UEFA):
Group A:  0–0 
Group B:  0–0

Rugby union
The Rugby Championship, Round 3:
In Wellington, New Zealand:  21–5 
In Perth, Australia:  26–19 
Standings: New Zealand 12 points, South Africa 7, Australia 4, Argentina 2.

Tennis
Grand Slams:
US Open in New York City, United States, day 13:
Men's Singles, semifinals: Andy Murray  [3] def. Tomáš Berdych  [6] 5–7, 6–2, 6–1, 7–6(9–7)

7 September 2012 (Friday)

Cycling
Grand Tours:
Vuelta a España, Stage 19:  Philippe Gilbert  4h 56' 25"  Alejandro Valverde  s.t.  Daniel Moreno  s.t.
General classification (all ESP): (1) Alberto Contador  77h 21' 49" (2) Valverde + 1' 35" (3) Joaquim Rodríguez  + 2' 21"
UCI World Tour:
Grand Prix Cycliste de Québec:  Simon Gerrans  4h 53' 04"  Greg Van Avermaet  s.t.  Rui Costa  + 4"
UCI World Tour standings (after 25 of 28 races): Bradley Wiggins  601 points (2) Joaquim Rodríguez  414 (3) Tom Boonen  410

Football (soccer)
2014 FIFA World Cup qualification (UEFA):
Group A:
 1–0 
 0–2 
Group B:
 0–1 
 2–2 
Group C:
 1–2 
 3–0 
Group D:
 0–2 
 0–5 
 2–0 
Group E:
 3–1 
 0–2 
 2–0 
Group F:
 2–0 
 1–1 
 1–2 
Group G:
 1–8 
 1–1 
 1–2 
Group H:
 2–2 
 0–5 
Group I:
 1–0 
 0–1 
2014 FIFA World Cup qualification (CONMEBOL)
 4–0 
 1–0 
 3–1 
 2–1

Tennis
Grand Slams:
US Open in New York City, United States, day 12:
Men's Doubles, final: Bob Bryan  & Mike Bryan  [2] def. Leander Paes  & Radek Štěpánek  [5] 6–3, 6–4
Bob and Mike Bryan win their 4th US Open and 12th Grand Slam title overall.
Women's Singles, semifinals:
Victoria Azarenka  [1] def. Maria Sharapova  [3] 3–6, 6–2, 6–4
Serena Williams  [4] def. Sara Errani  [10] 6–1, 6–2

6 September 2012 (Thursday)

Cycling
Grand Tours:
Vuelta a España, Stage 18:  Daniele Bennati  4h 17' 17"  Ben Swift  s.t.  Allan Davis  s.t.
General classification (all ESP): (1) Alberto Contador  72h 25' 21" (2) Alejandro Valverde + 1' 52" (3) Joaquim Rodríguez  + 2' 28"

Tennis
Grand Slams:
US Open in New York City, United States, day 11:
Mixed Doubles, final: Ekaterina Makarova  & Bruno Soares  def. Květa Peschke  & Marcin Matkowski  [4] 6–7(8–10), 6–1, [12–10]
Makarova & Soares win their first Grand Slam title.
Men's Singles, quarterfinals:
David Ferrer  [4] def. Janko Tipsarević  [8] 6–3, 6–7(5–7), 2–6, 6–3, 7–6(7–4)
Novak Djokovic  [2] def. Juan Martín del Potro  [7] 6–2, 7–6(7–3), 6–4

5 September 2012 (Wednesday)

American football
NFL, Week 1:
Kickoff game in East Rutherford, New Jersey: Dallas Cowboys 24, New York Giants 17.

Basketball
FIBA EuroBasket 2013 qualification:
Group A:
 92–75 
 87–62 
 76–67 
Group B:
 79–69 
 82–76 
Group C:
 84–80 
 97–81 
Group D:
 103–107 
 81–86 
Group E:
 91–96 
 82–73 
Group F:
 82–83 
 90–71

Cycling
Grand Tours:
Vuelta a España, Stage 17:  Alberto Contador  4h 29' 20"  Alejandro Valverde  + 6"  Sergio Henao  s.t.
General classification (all ESP): (1) Contador  68h 07' 54" (2) Valverde + 1' 52" (3) Joaquim Rodríguez  + 2' 28"

Tennis
Grand Slams:
US Open in New York City, United States, day 10:
Men's Singles, fourth round: 
Juan Martín del Potro  [7] def. Andy Roddick  [20] 6–7(1–7), 7–6(7–4), 6–2, 6–4
Novak Djokovic  [2] def. Stanislas Wawrinka  [18] 6–4, 6–1, 3–1, retired
Janko Tipsarević  [8] def. Philipp Kohlschreiber  [19] 6–3, 7–6(7–5), 6–2
Men's Singles, quarterfinals:
Tomáš Berdych  [6] def. Roger Federer  [1] 7–6(7–1), 6–4, 3–6, 6–3 
Andy Murray  [3] def. Marin Čilić  [12] 3–6, 7–6(7–4), 6–2, 6–0
Women's Singles, quarterfinals:
Maria Sharapova  [3] def. Marion Bartoli  [11] 3–6, 6–3, 6–4
Serena Williams  [4] def. Ana Ivanovic  [12] 6–1, 6–3
Sara Errani  [10] def. Roberta Vinci  [20] 6–2, 6–4

4 September 2012 (Thursday)

Football (soccer)
U-20 Women's World Cup in Japan:
Semi-finals:
 0–2 
 0–3

Tennis
Grand Slams:
US Open in New York City, United States, day 9:
Men's Singles, fourth round: David Ferrer  [4] def. Richard Gasquet  [13] 7–5, 7–6(7–2), 6–4
Women's Singles, quarterfinals: Victoria Azarenka  [1] def. Samantha Stosur  [7] 6–1, 4–6, 7–6(7–5)

3 September 2012 (Monday)

Cycling
Grand Tours:
Vuelta a España, Stage 16:  Dario Cataldo  5h 18' 28" (2) Thomas De Gendt  + 7" (3) Joaquim Rodríguez  + 2' 39"
General classification (all ESP): (1) Rodríguez  63h 38' 24" (2) Alberto Contador + 28" (3) Alejandro Valverde + 2' 04"

Tennis
Grand Slams:
US Open in New York City, United States, day 8:
Men's Singles, fourth round:
Marin Čilić  [12] def. Martin Kližan  7–5, 6–4, 6–0
Roger Federer  [1] def. Mardy Fish  [23] walkover
Andy Murray  [3] def. Milos Raonic  [15] 6–4, 6–4, 6–2
Tomáš Berdych  [6] def. Nicolás Almagro  [11] 7–6(7–4), 6–4, 6–1
Women's Singles, fourth round:
Ana Ivanovic  [12] def. Tsvetana Pironkova  6–0, 6–4
Serena Williams  [4] def. Andrea Hlaváčková  6–0, 6–0
Sara Errani  [10] def. Angelique Kerber  [6] 7–6(7–5), 6–3
Roberta Vinci  [20] def. Agnieszka Radwańska  [2] 6–1, 6–4

2 September 2012 (Sunday)

Auto racing
Formula One:
Belgian Grand Prix in Spa: (1) Jenson Button  (McLaren-Mercedes) (2) Sebastian Vettel  (Red Bull-Renault) (3) Kimi Räikkönen  (Lotus-Renault)
Drivers' championship standings (after 12 of 20 races): (1) Fernando Alonso  (Ferrari) 164 points (2) Vettel 140 (3) Mark Webber  (Red Bull-Renault) 132

1 September 2012 (Saturday)

American football
NCAA Division I FBS:
Emerald Isle Classic in Dublin, Ireland: Notre Dame 50, Navy 10.
Chick-fil-A Kickoff Game in Atlanta, Georgia: Clemson 26, Auburn 19.
Cowboys Classic in Arlington, Texas: Alabama 41, Michigan 14.

Cycling
Grand Tours:
Vuelta a España, Stage 14 (all ESP):  Joaquim Rodríguez 4h 10' 28"  Alberto Contador + 5"  Alejandro Valverde + 13"
General classification: (1) Rodríguez  53h 06' 33" (2) Contador + 22" (3) Chris Froome  + 1' 41"

Football (soccer)
CAF Champions League group stage, matchday 5:
Group B: Zamalek  1–1  Berekum Chelsea

Multi-sport
Summer Paralympics in London:
Athletics:
Women's club throw F31/32/51:  Maroua Ibrahmi  1064 points (WR)  Mounia Gasmi  1052  Gemma Prescott  1015
Men's shot put F54/55/56:  Jalil Bagheri Jeddi  988 points (PR)  Karol Kozun  973  Robin Womack  972
Men's long jump F13:  Luis Felipe Gutierrez  7.54 m (PR)  Ángel Jiménez Cabeza  7.14 m  Radoslav Zlatanov  6.81 m
Men's 200 m T42:  Richard Whitehead  24.38 (WR)  Shaquille Vance  25.55  Heinrich Popow  25.90
Women's discus throw F11/12:  Liangmin Zhang  40.13 (PR)  Hongxia Tang  39.91  Claire Williams  39.63
Women's 200 m T36:  Elena Ivanova  30.25  Min Jae Jeon  31.08  Claudia Nicoleitzik  32.08
Women's 100 m T38:  Margarita Goncharova  13.45  Junfei Chen  13.53  Inna Stryzhak  13.64
Women's shot put F54/55/56:  Liwan Yang  1057 points (WR)  Marianne Buggenhagen  946  Angela Madsen  934
Men's javelin throw F33/34:  Mohsen Kaedi  38.30 (WR)  Yanzhang Wang  38.23  Kamel Kardjena  26.40
Men's 100 m T13:  Jason Smyth  10.46 (WR)  Luis Felipe Gutierrez  11.02  Jonathan Ntutu  11.03
Men's triple jump F46:  Fuliang Liu  15.20 (WR)  Arnaud Assoumani  14.28  Aliaksandr Subota  14.00
Men's 100 m T35:  Iurii Tsaruk  12.62  Teboho Mokgalagadi  13.10  Xinhan Fu  13.12
Women's javelin throw F46:  Katarzyna Piekart  41.15 (WR)  Nataliya Gudkova  41.08  Madeleine Hogan  38.85 
Women's 200 m T52:  Michelle Stilwell  33.80 (PR)  Marieke Vervoort   Kerry Morgan  36.49
Men's 800 m T37:  Michael McKillop  1:57.22 (WR)  Mohamed Charmi  2:01.45  Brad Scott  2:02.04
Men's 100 m T38:  Evan O'Hanlon  10.79 (WR)  Dyan Buis  11.11  Wenjun Zhou  11.22
Women's 200 m T46:  Yunidis Castillo  24.45 (WR)  Alicja Fiodorow  25.49  Anrune Liebenberg  25.55
Cycling:
Men's 1 km time trial B:  Neil Fachie  1:01.351 (WR)  José Enrique Porto Lareo  1:02.707  Rinne Oost  1:03.052
Men's individual pursuit C4:  Carol-Eduard Novak   Jiří Ježek   Jody Cundy 
Men's individual pursuit C5:  Michael Gallagher   Jon-Allan Butterworth   Xinyang Liu 
Women's 500 m time trial C1–3:  Yin He  39.158 (WR)  Alyda Norbruis  39.174  Jayme Paris  40.476 (WR) 
Women's 500 m time trial C4–5:  Sarah Storey  36.997  Jennifer Schuble  37.941  Jianping Ruan  38.194 (WR)
Equestrian:
Individual championship test grade II:  Natasha Baker  76.857  Britta Napel  76.048  Angelika Trabert  76.000
Individual championship test grade Ib:  Joann Formosa  75.826  Lee Pearson  75.391  Pepo Puch  75.043
Judo:
Men's 90 kg:  Jorge Hierrezuelo Marcillis   Samuel Ingram   Jorge Lencina  & Dartanyon Crockett 
Men's 100 kg:  Gwang-Geun Choi   Myles Porter   Antônio Tenório Silva  & Vladimir Fedin 
Men's +100 kg:  Kento Masaki   Song Wang   Yangaliny Jimenez Dominguez  & Ilham Zakiyev 
Women's 70 kg:  Carmen Herrera   Tatiana Savostyanova  Qian Zhou  & Nikolett Szabo 
Women's +70 kg;  Yanping Yuan   Nazan Akın   Zoubida Bouazoug  & Irina Kalyanova

Tennis
Grand Slams:
US Open in New York City, United States, day 6:
Men's Singles, third round:
Roger Federer  [1] def. Fernando Verdasco  [25] 6–3, 6–4, 6–4
Mardy Fish  [23] def. Gilles Simon  [16] 6–1, 5–7, 7–6(7–5), 6–3
Andy Murray  [3] def. Feliciano López  [30] 7–6(7–5), 7–6(7–5), 4–6, 7–6(7–4)
Tomáš Berdych  [6] def. Sam Querrey  [27] 6–7(6–8), 6–4, 6–3, 6–2
Nicolás Almagro  [11] def. Jack Sock  7–6(7–3), 6–7(4–7), 7–6(7–2), 6–1
Milos Raonic  [15] def. James Blake  6–3, 6–0, 7–6(7–3)
Marin Čilić  [12] def. Kei Nishikori  6–3, 6–4, 6–7(3–7), 6–3 
Martin Kližan  def. Jérémy Chardy  [32] 6–4, 6–4, 6–4
Women's Singles, third round:
Agnieszka Radwańska  [2] def. Jelena Janković  6–3, 7–5
Serena Williams  [4] def. Ekaterina Makarova  6–4, 6–0
Ana Ivanovic  [12] def. Sloane Stephens  6–7(4–7), 6–4, 6–2
Roberta Vinci  [20] def. Dominika Cibulková  6–2, 7–5
Angelique Kerber  [6] def. Olga Govortsova  6–1, 6–2
Andrea Hlaváčková  def. Maria Kirilenko  [14] 5–7, 6–4, 6–4
Tsvetana Pironkova  def. Silvia Soler Espinosa  6–1, 6–7(3–7), 6–3 
Sara Errani  def. Olga Puchkova  6–1, 6–1

References

VIIII